Daphne papyracea is a shrub, of the family Thymelaeaceae. It is evergreen, and is found across Asia, from Pakistan through central Nepal to China. Daphne laciniata from Yunnan has been treated as a separate species or as part of D. papyracea.

Description

Subspecies and varieties
, The Plant List accepts the following infrataxa:
Daphne papyracea subsp. jinyunensis (C.Yung Chang) Halda (syn. Daphne jinyunensis C.Yung Chang)
Daphne papyracea subsp. yunnanensis (H.F.Zhou ex C.Yung Chang) Halda (syn. Daphne yunnanensis H.F.Zhou ex C.Yung Chang)
Daphne papyracea var. longituba (C.Yung Chang) Halda (syn. Daphne longituba C.Yung Chang)
Daphne papyracea var. xichouensis (H.F.Zhou ex C.Yung Chang) Halda (syn. Daphne xichouensis H.F.Zhou ex C.Yung Chang)

The Flora of China recognizes these as separate species. They were reduced to infrataxa of Daphne papyracea by Josef Halda in 1997 and 2000.

Daphne papyracea subsp. jinyunensis is distinguished from subsp. papyracea by its dark, very finely hairy branches, inflorescences with few flowers and very small bracteoles. Its flowers are 6–8 mm long and 3–4 mm across. It is native to Chongqing in Sichuan, China, where it is found in open forests on rocky slopes.

Daphne papyracea subsp. yunnanensis is distinguished from subsp. papyracea by the shape of its leaves which usually have tips that are pointed to heart-shaped (acuminate-caudate) and the shape of the disk which is almost divided into four parts, having two bifid lobes. It is native to south-west Yunnan, where it occurs in montane forests.

Daphne papyracea var. longituba is a variety of D. papyracea subsp. papyracea. It differs in the length of the flowers, which are 10–14 mm long. It is found in forests and valleys at 1000–1200 m in north-east Guangxi, China.

Daphne papyracea var. xichouensis has reddish-white flowers and is found at 1500–1800 m on moist shrubby slopes in south-east Yunnan, China.

Usage for paper
It is mentioned as a "paper shrub" by an English botanist in 1818. It is known as the main source of raw material for the production of lokta paper, a hand-made paper from Nepal.

References

papyracea